Lake Tawakoni State Park is a state park located in Hunt County, Texas, United States,  north of Wills Point. It is on the south central shore of Lake Tawakoni.

History
Constructed in 1960, the lake is named after the Tawakoni Native American tribe, who used to live in the area.  It was built to provide a source of water for the Dallas area, and the park was opened in 2002 under a lease agreement with the Sabine River Authority.

The park came to media attention in 2007, because of a giant communal spider web on the premises of the park.

References

External links
 

Protected areas of Hunt County, Texas
State parks of Texas
Protected areas established in 1984
1984 establishments in Texas